The R459 road is a regional road in Ireland, located in Doolin, County Clare.

References

Regional roads in the Republic of Ireland
Roads in County Clare